Swayambhunathaswamy Temple is a Hindu temple located in Peralam in the Mayiladuthurai district of Tamil Nadu, India.

Location

It is located at a distance of 3 km from Kollumangudi, at Peralam in Kumbakonam-Karaikkal road.

Presiding deity 
The presiding deity is known as Swayambhunathaswamy and the goddess is Bhavani.

Specialities 
The temple tanks are Surya tirtta and Chandra tirtta.   Perala munivar, Yagyavalkiyar, Shukracharya, Markandeya and Vishvamitra worshipped the deity of the temple.  In this temple rajagopura, Dhwaja Stambha, nandhi, shrines of the presiding deity and the goddess are found.

Worshipping time
Kumbhabhishekham of the temple was held on 29 January 1959. The temple is opened for worship from 6.00 a.m. to 12.00 p.m. and from 4.00 p.m. to 8.00 p.m.

References 

Shiva temples in Mayiladuthurai district